The Lowe Alpine Mountain Marathon (or LAMM) is a two-day fell running and orienteering race held in the Scottish Highlands each June.  Teams of two run and navigate over mountainous terrain, carrying all their gear for an overnight wild camp.  LAMM has six classes of competition: Elite, A, B, C, D and Score.  Over the two days, the elite competitors complete a course of approximately 70 km with 4000m of ascent over challenging terrain.

The event location is kept secret until 48 hours before the start, and competitors do not know where the route will take them until they cross the start line.  Teams are then given a series of grid reference checkpoints which they must navigate to and choose a route between.

LAMM is often considered to be the smaller cousin of the Karrimor International Mountain Marathon, the original event of this kind.  Unlike KIMM, competition for places is not so fierce on LAMM and most who apply get a place first time.  LAMM calls itself the Connoisseurs Mountain Marathon, and is celebrated amongst competitors for its unexpected twists and impeccable logistical organisation.  Since the first event in Arrochar in 1994, the event has seen a steady increase in numbers, with over 550 teams entering in 2005.  

The organiser of LAMM, Martin Stone is himself an elite fell runner.  Notable 
competitors include Sir Ranulph Fiennes.

Event Locations
1994 – Arrochar
1995 – Isle of Mull
1996 – Lochaber
1997 – Isle of Jura
1998 – Ardgour
1999 – Black Mount
2000 – Glen Shiel
2001 – Kinloch Laggan
2002 – Braes of Balquhidder
2003 – Spittal of Glenshee
2004 – Glen Carron
2005 – Isle of Mull
2006 – Assynt
2007 – Glen Lochay
2008 – Glenfinnan
2009 – Kintail
2010 – Glen Fyne
2011 – Beinn Dearg
2012 - Ben Cruachan
2013 - No event
2014 - Strathcarron

External links
LAMM
Competing in LAMM
planetFear equipment guide

Lowe Alpine Mountain Marathon
Orienteering in the United Kingdom